Computers & Graphics is a peer-reviewed scientific journal that covers computer graphics and related subjects such as data visualization, human-computer interaction, virtual reality, and augmented reality. It was established in 1975 and originally published by Pergamon Press. It is now published by Elsevier which acquired Pergamon Press in 1991. Graphics and Visual Computing is an open access sister journal sharing the same editorial team and double-blind peer-review policies.

History
The journal was established in 1975 by founding editor-in-chief Robert Schiffman (University of Colorado, Boulder), as Computers & Graphics-UK. Schiffman, who co-organized the first SIGGRAPH conference in 1974, had the conference proceedings published as the first issue of the journal. He was succeeded in 1978 by Larry Feeser (Rensselaer Polytechnic Institute). In 1983 José Luis Encarnação (Technische Hochschule Darmstadt) took over. Joaquim Jorge (University of Lisbon) has been editor since 2007.

Replicability
The journal is working with the Graphics Replicability Stamp Initiative.

Abstracting and indexing
The journal is abstracted and indexed in:
Current Contents/Engineering, Computing & Technology
EBSCO databases
Ei Compendex
Inspec
ProQuest databases
Science Citation Index Expanded
Scopus
According to the Journal Citation Reports, the journal has a 2020 impact factor of 1.936.

References

External links

Computer graphics
Computer science journals
Publications established in 1975
English-language journals
Elsevier academic journals
Virtual reality
Visualization (research)